Scyphophorus acupunctatus, the sisal weevil or agave weevil, is a species of polyphaga beetle of the family of the Curculionidae.

References

Beetles of North America
Curculionidae
Beetles described in 1838
Edible insects